is a Japanese freestyle wrestler. She won the gold medal in the women's 50 kg event at the 2020 Summer Olympics. She defeated all 4 of her opponents at the Olympics by technical superiority and without conceding a single point. She has not been beaten in a single bout since 2010, except for three losses to Yuki Irie in 2015, 2017 and 2019. She has been coached by Shoko Yoshimura, 5-time world champion, since she was 13 years old.

Career 
An exceptionally technical wrestler, in 2017, she won a gold medal at Paris World Wrestling Championships at 48 kg, and in 2018, she won gold at the Budapest World Wrestling Championships at 50 kg. She won the gold medal in the women's 50kg event at the 2022 World Wrestling Championships held in Belgrade, Serbia.

She competed at Golden Grand Prix Ivan Yarygin 2017 and won a gold medal. In 2018, she won the gold medal in the women's 50 kg event at the Klippan Lady Open in Klippan, Sweden. Susaki beat Maria Stadnik and in a rematch dominated the number 1 2021 Olympic seed 10–1, winning by technical fall. Although widely regarded as the best wrestler in the 50 kg class  Susaki entered the Tokyo games unseeded, where she went on to win gold.

On July 5, 2021, she was named flagbearer of the Japanese delegation to the Summer Olympics by the Japanese Olympic Committee, together with basketball player Rui Hachimura.

Susaki also studies in the Sport science faculty at Waseda University.

Awards
Tokyo Sports
Wrestling Special Award (2017)

References

External links 
 
 
 

World Wrestling Champions
Japanese female sport wrestlers
1999 births
Living people
Wrestlers at the 2020 Summer Olympics
Olympic wrestlers of Japan
Medalists at the 2020 Summer Olympics
Olympic medalists in wrestling
Olympic gold medalists for Japan
Sportspeople from Chiba Prefecture
21st-century Japanese women